Dürnau may refer to two towns in Baden-Württemberg, Germany:

Dürnau, Biberach, in the district of Biberach
Dürnau, Göppingen, in the district of Göppingen